Yaiza Castilla Herrera (born July 5, 1984, in San Sebastián de La Gomera, Spain) is a Spanish politician and former senator. She served in the Senate of Spain representing La Gomera in the 11th and 12th Legislatures of Spain between 2015 and 2019. She was appointed Minister of Tourism, Industry and Commerce since July 17, 2019 for Canary Islands by President Ángel Víctor Torres.

Biography and career 
Herrera was born in San Sebastián de La Gomera in 1984. She attended the University of La Laguna where she graduated with a master's degree in Urban Law. After her education, she worked as a freelance attorney before joining Garrigues.

In 2015, during the general elections contested for a sit in the Senate through the Gomera Socialist Group. While she was in the senate, she was a member of the Equality Commission.

References 

Living people
1984 births
People from La Gomera
Spanish politicians
Members of the 12th Senate of Spain
Members of the 11th Senate of Spain